The Rumney Railway in Wales was a  plateway built to connect the ironworks at Rhymney to the Monmouthshire Canal Company's tramroad near Newport, Wales providing a connection the wharves at the Newport Docks. The line was opened in 1826.  It was  later converted to a standard gauge railway,

History

The company was incorporated in 1825 and the line, engineered by George Overton, opened the following year worked by horses.  The line ran down the east side of the River Rhymney to Machen where the route left the river to head east towards Newport. It made a junction with the Monmouthshire line at the top end of that part of the company's route, known as the Park Mile, on its way to the shipping places on the River Usk at Newport. Sir Charles Morgan built and maintained the section where it ran through the park of his Tredegar House. 

The line operated in a similar way to a toll road and traders introduced steam locomotives in the 1840s.   In 1856 Crawshay Bailey  purchased a plateway locomotive from the Monmouthshire company for the Rumney Railway, implying that the company was operating the line with its own locomotives.

The Monmouthshire company converted its lines in the Western Valleys to standard gauge in the 1850s. In 1861 Lord Tredegar (Chairman) and Crawshay Bailey (Director) obtained an Act of Parliament to reincorporate the Rumney Railway as a railway company, with powers to reconstruct the line as a standard gauge railway.  Also obtained were powers to make a branch to join the Rhymney Railway at Caerphilly and to sell or lease the undertaking to either the Monmouthshire Railway or the West Midland Railway. However, little was done to improve the line and it remained a plateway until it was acquired by the Brecon and Merthyr Railway by its Act of 28 July 1863.

The reconstructed line was finally passed as safe for passengers by the Board of Trade Inspector on his third visit, and opened to passenger traffic through to the Monmouthshire Railway's Newport (Dock Street) station on 14 June 1865.

References

External links
Rumney Railway at railbrit.co.uk

Industrial railways in Wales
Early Welsh railway companies
Great Western Railway constituents
Rail transport in Newport, Wales
Railway lines in Wales
History of Monmouthshire
Railway lines opened in 1826
4 ft 2 in gauge railways in Wales
Horse-drawn railways
1826 establishments in Wales